Osornophryne sumacoensis is a species of toad in the family Bufonidae. It is endemic to the Ecuador and only found in the forests surrounding a small crater lake on the eastern slopes of Sumaco, a volcano in the Napo Province.

Description
Skin has many tubercles. The back and limbs are blueish-black, but the belly is blue with black spots. Head is small.

Osornophryne sumacoensis can be active both day and night. It is a terrestrial species. During the daytime specimens have been found under leaf-litter.

Reproduction
Osornophryne sumacoensis has direct development. Eggs are laid on soil under vegetation.

Habitat and conservation
Osornophryne sumacoensis inhabits the cloud forest surrounding the lake, at  asl.

The species lives within the Sumaco Napo-Galeras National Park. Volcanic eruption is a threat to this species restricted to a single location.

References

sumacoensis
Amphibians of Ecuador
Endemic fauna of Ecuador
Amphibians described in 1995
Taxonomy articles created by Polbot